Sonny Schmidt (1958–2004) was a Samoan professional bodybuilder.

Biography
He was born Edmond Alten Schmidt on 9 September 1953 or 19 September 1953. He grew up in Western Samoa. He later lived in Melbourne, Australia and travelled frequently to the United States for competitions.

He placed in many events between 1989 and 1999. The career highlight for Schmidt came when he won the 1995 IFBB Masters Olympia becoming the first Samoan to do so. Schmidt was 5'10" and weighed 240 pounds at competition weight. He was arrested in 2000 on allegations that he assisted Australian drug lord Tony Mokbel to import cocaine from Mexico City into Australia. He pleaded guilty to the charges and was sentenced to a period of three years imprisonment. Around this time Schmidt became a born-again Christian.

Schmidt died on 25 January 2004 from cancer.

References

Australian sportspeople of Samoan descent
Samoan expatriates in Australia
Australian bodybuilders
1953 births
2004 deaths
Deaths from cancer in Victoria (Australia)